Chemical Computing Group is a software company specializing in research software for computational chemistry, bioinformatics, cheminformatics, docking, pharmacophore searching and molecular simulation. The company's main customer base consists of pharmaceutical and biotechnology companies, as well as academic research groups.  It is a private company that was founded in 1994; it is based in Montreal, Quebec, Canada.  Its main product,  Molecular Operating Environment (MOE), is written in a self-contained programming system, the Scientific Vector Language (SVL).

Products 
 MOE (Molecular Operating Environment)

MOE is a drug discovery software platform that integrates visualization, modeling, and simulations, as well as methodology development. MOE scientific applications are used by biologists, medicinal chemists and computational chemists in pharmaceutical, biotechnology and academic research. MOE runs on Windows, Linux, Unix, and MAC OS X.

Main application areas: Structure-Based Design, Fragment-Based Design, Pharmacophore Discovery, Medicinal Chemistry Applications, Biologics Applications, Protein and Antibody Modeling, Molecular Modeling and Simulations, Cheminformatics & QSAR

 PSILO: A Protein Structure Database System

PSILO is a protein structure database system that provides a repository for macromolecular and protein-ligand structural information. It allows research organizations to track, register and search both experimental and computational macromolecular structural data. A web-browser interface facilitates the searching and accessing of public and private structural data.

See also
Other institutions developing software for computational chemistry:
 Accelrys
 BioSolveIT
 Cresset Biomolecular Discovery
 Desert Scientific Software
 Inte:Ligand
 MolSoft
 OpenEye Scientific Software
 Pharmacelera
 Schrödinger
 VLifeMDS Software
 NovaMechanics Ltd Cheminformatics Solutions

References

External links
 
 Excellence Award for student posters at ACS National Meetings
 Review of MOE 2005.06
 Molecular fingerprints in MOE
 Discussion of Binary QSAR: Jürgen Bajorath (2004), Chemoinformatics: Concepts, Methods, and Tools for Drug Discovery page 92 

Research support companies
Software companies of Canada
Companies based in Montreal
Molecular modelling software